Daniel Pacheco Lobato (born 5 January 1991) is a Spanish footballer who plays as a left winger or an attacking midfielder for Polish side Górnik Zabrze. He joined Liverpool in 2007 having previously been in the youth ranks at Barcelona.

Club career

Early career
Pacheco signed for Liverpool from Barcelona for an undisclosed fee in the summer of 2007 and initially played for Liverpool reserves. Before his transfer, Pacheco enjoyed a reputation as a rising star in the ranks of Barcelona's youth academy. Such was his ability to score goals from almost any position, teammates nicknamed him  ("The Assassin").

Pacheco made his first start for the Liverpool reserves on 5 February 2008, against Bolton Wanderers. He scored the first goal of the game, a low curling shot past Ian Walker. In April 2008, Pacheco made a 50-yard pass to assist Krisztián Németh in scoring the only goal of the game against Blackburn Rovers Reserves, which secured the Premier Reserve League North title for Liverpool. On 7 May 2008, Pacheco, who came on as a substitute in the second half, threaded a through pass to teammate Lucas to score the third and final goal in Liverpool's Reserve League final victory over Aston Villa at Anfield.

Liverpool

Pacheco made his first team debut on 9 December 2009 as a second-half substitute for Alberto Aquilani in a UEFA Champions League match against Fiorentina. His league debut came on 26 December when he replaced Aquilani once more in a 2–0 home win over Wolverhampton Wanderers.

On 18 February 2010, Pacheco came on as a substitute in the 75th minute for Aquilani again in a UEFA Europa League match versus Unirea Urziceni; six minutes later, he provided a headed assist for David N'Gog's match-winning goal.

On 10 August 2010, Pacheco was handed the number 12 for the 2010–11 season, previously worn by Fábio Aurélio, who was handed number 6 after he re-signed for the club. On 3 December, Liverpool confirmed that both he and Martin Kelly had signed contract extensions until June 2014.

On 23 March 2011, Pacheco joined Norwich City on emergency loan until the end of the season, being handed the number 37 shirt. He made his debut against Scunthorpe United on 2 April, setting up the first goal for Grant Holt and playing through the pass which won the penalty for Norwich's second goal in a 6–0 rout at Carrow Road. He scored his first Norwich goal in the 5–1 away victory over East Anglia derby rivals Ipswich Town on the 21st, concluding the thrashing after coming on as a substitute for Wes Hoolahan.

On 24 August 2011, Atlético Madrid announced on their official website that Pacheco had joined the club on loan from Liverpool for the 2011–12 La Liga season, and would be immediately loaned to Rayo Vallecano for the year. It was also confirmed that Atlético had an option to buy Pacheco at the end of the season. Pacheco made his debut for Rayo Vallecano as 84th-minute substitute in the 0–1 win against Getafe on 18 September.

On 31 January 2013, Pacheco was loaned to second-tier Huesca until the end of the season. Pacheco scored on his debut for Huesca, the last goal in a 2–0 win over Real Murcia on 3 February. He helped his team with 5 goals in 19 matches.

Later career
On 2 September 2013, Pacheco joined Spanish second division side AD Alcorcón on permanent basis.

Pacheco left Alcorcón at the end of the 2013–14 season and signed for Real Betis on 11 July 2014. He appeared in 23 matches during the campaign, as his side returned to La Liga after a one-year absence.

On 28 July 2015, Pacheco was loaned to Deportivo Alavés in the second division, for one year. After again achieving top level promotion, he moved to Getafe CF on 23 July of the following year, also in a temporary deal.

Pacheco achieved a third consecutive top tier promotion with Geta, and was bought outright on 3 July 2017. On 15 August of the following year, he signed a three-year contract with Málaga CF in the second division.

Pacheco was one of the eight first team players released by Málaga on 3 October 2020, due to a layoff. The following 1 February, he signed a short-term contract with fellow second division side UD Logroñés. Pacheco was released in June 2021 following the expiration of his contract.
Pacheco signed for Aris Limassol on 25 August 2021 as a free agent and was released by the club on 31 January 2022.

On 10 March 2022, he joined Polish club Górnik Zabrze until the end of the season.

International career
At the 2010 UEFA European Under-19 Championship, Pacheco scored twice in Spain's group match against Portugal. He then went on to score another goal against quarter-final opponents Italy as Spain qualified for the semi-finals. He went on to score early in the semi-final against England, a game in which Spain won 3–1. They then lost the final against France 2–1, with Pacheco making an assist. He won the Golden Boot at the Championships after scoring four goals.

Pacheco made his debut for the Spain U21 team – alongside Liverpool teammate Daniel Ayala – when he featured in a friendly against France on 24 March. He played 45 minutes and received a yellow card as a second-half substitute in the 3–2 friendly defeat. He was selected as part of the Spain U20 squad to compete at the 2011 FIFA U-20 World Cup in Colombia.

Career statistics

Honours
Betis
Segunda División: 2014–15

Alavés
Segunda División: 2015–16

Spain U19
UEFA European Under-19 Championship runner-up: 2010

References

External links

LFCHistory Profile

1991 births
Living people
Sportspeople from the Province of Málaga
Spanish footballers
Association football forwards
Premier League players
English Football League players
Segunda División players
La Liga players
Ekstraklasa players
FC Barcelona players
Liverpool F.C. players
Norwich City F.C. players
Atlético Madrid footballers
Rayo Vallecano players
SD Huesca footballers
AD Alcorcón footballers
Real Betis players
Deportivo Alavés players
Getafe CF footballers
Málaga CF players
UD Logroñés players
Górnik Zabrze players
Spain youth international footballers
Spain under-21 international footballers
Spanish expatriate footballers
Expatriate footballers in England
Spanish expatriate sportspeople in England
Expatriate footballers in Poland
Spanish expatriate sportspeople in Poland